An equerry (from French  'stable', and related to  'squire') is an officer of honour. Historically, it was a senior attendant with responsibilities for the horses of a person of rank. In contemporary use, it is a personal attendant, usually upon a sovereign, a member of a royal family, or a national representative. The role is equivalent to an aide-de-camp, but the term is now prevalent only in the Commonwealth of Nations.

Australia
Australian equerries are commissioned officers in the Australian Defence Force, appointed on an ad hoc basis to the King of Australia, Governor General, state governors or to visiting foreign heads of state.

Canada
Canadian equerries are drawn from the commissioned officers of the Canadian Armed Forces, and are most frequently appointed to serve visiting members of the Canadian Royal Family. The equerry appointed for the King of Canada is a senior officer, typically a major or a lieutenant-commander, while the equerry appointed for a child of the monarch is a junior officer, typically a captain or naval lieutenant.

Canadian equerries are also sometimes appointed to serve national representatives of the country. Colonel the Hon Henry Jackman of The Governor General's Horse Guards, Canada's Household Cavalry regiment, is the equerry to Akaash Maharaj, in the latter's role as head of UNICEF Team Canada.

New Zealand
New Zealand equerries are appointed to serve the King of New Zealand only for the duration of a royal visit to the country, and are always drawn from the officers of the New Zealand Defence Force, typically captains, flight lieutenants, and navy lieutenants.

Squadron Leader Leanne Woon of the Operational Support Squadron, part of the Royal New Zealand Air Force, was the equerry to the Queen of New Zealand during the most recent royal visit in 2002. She is the only woman to serve as an equerry to the monarch anywhere in the Commonwealth. Captain Sam Stevenson of the New Zealand Army served as equerry to the Duke of Cambridge during his 2005 visit to New Zealand. Squadron Leader Marcel 'Shagga' Scott of the Royal New Zealand Air Force served as equerry to HRH Prince Charles in November 2012. Squadron Leader Tim Costley of the Royal New Zealand Air Force served as equerry to the Duke of Cambridge during the 2014 Royal visit to New Zealand by the Duke and Duchess of Cambridge and Prince George.

United Kingdom

In the UK equerries are appointed by working members of the Royal family and are drawn from senior officers of the British Armed Forces. The role involves being in regular close attendance both within the royal residence and outside on public engagements. 

The Royal Household also includes a number of "extra equerries" – honorary appointees drawn from among the current and retired senior officers of the Royal Household. They are comparatively rarely required for duty, but their attendance can be called upon if needed.

The Crown Equerry is in charge of the Royal Mews Department and holds a distinct office.

Equerries, Temporary Equerries and Extra Equerries are entitled to wear aiguillettes as part of their uniform, and to wear the appropriate royal cypher below their badges of rank on the shoulder board (or equivalent). Army officers serving as equerries or extra equerries may wear a distinctive cocked hat (with red and white upright feathers) when on duty in full dress uniform.

Present-day
At the time of his accession to the throne, the household of Charles III included at least two equerries. 

Individuals who have served as Equerry to the King include:

Other working members of the Royal Family can also appoint Equerries; in the case of more junior members the appointment might be combined with another post. Like the monarch, they may also appoint Extra Equerries.

Past
For most of her reign Queen Elizabeth II maintained an establishment of two Equerries plus a Temporary Equerry: the senior Equerry was a permanent appointment (joined to the position of Deputy Master of the Household); whereas the junior Equerry (who routinely held office for three years) was appointed in turn from each of the three services of the British Armed Forces. The Temporary Equerry was a captain of the Coldstream Guards, who provided part-time attendance, and who (when not required for duty) was assigned to regimental or staff duties. 

On overseas tours to Commonwealth realms an equerry was often appointed from the local armed forces to serve for the duration of the tour.

At her funeral, the late Queen's senior Equerry and junior Equerry, ten past Equerries and two Extra Equerries marched together as pallbearers (following a custom established by Queen Victoria); in this role (which is separate from that of the bearer party which carried the coffin) they walked immediately alongside the late Queen's coffin in each of the State funeral processions which took place in London and Windsor.

Individuals who served as equerry to Elizabeth II include:

Those appointed as Extra Equerries (since the year 2000) included:
 Lieutenant Colonel Stephen Segrave (Secretary, Central Chancery of the Orders of Knighthood) in 2019
 Lieutenant Colonel Michael Vernon (then Secretary, Central Chancery of the Orders of Knighthood, now Comptroller, the Lord Chamberlain's Office) in 2015
 Vice Admiral Tony Johnstone-Burt (Master of the Household)
 Lieutenant Colonel Alexander Matheson, younger of Matheson (then Secretary, Central Chancery of the Orders of Knighthood, now Senior Gentleman Usher) in 2006
 Lieutenant Colonel Sir Andrew Ford (Comptroller, the Lord Chamberlain's Office) in 2005
 Air Vice Marshal David Walker (Master of the Household) in 2005 
 Group Captain Timothy Hewlett (Director of Royal Travel) in 2001 
 Vice Admiral Sir James Weatherall (former Marshal of the Diplomatic Corps) in 2001
 Vice Admiral Tom Blackburn (Master of the Household) in 2000
 Lieutenant Colonel Robert Cartwright (Secretary, Central Chancery of the Orders of Knighthood) in 2000
Senior courtiers often continued as Extra Equerries (or could be appointed to the position) after retirement; as such, they were sometimes called upon to represent the Queen e.g. at funerals or memorial services for former colleagues.

Other senior royals generally followed the Queen's pattern of appointing an equerry from one of the three armed services, in rotation; and of appointing a Temporary Equerry, often from a regiment with which they had personal links: e.g. the Duke of Edinburgh used to appoint a Temporary Equerry from the Grenadier Guards, the Queen Mother one from the Irish Guards, the Prince of Wales one from the Welsh Guards.

See also 

 Crown Equerry
 Crown Equerry (Sweden)
 Batman (military)
 Master of the Horse
 Valet

References

 
Positions within the British Royal Household
Horse-related professions and professionals